The Fiji national rugby union team represents Fiji in men's international rugby union competes every four years at the Rugby World Cup, and their best performances were the 1987 and 2007 tournaments when they defeated Argentina and Wales respectively to reach the quarterfinals. Fiji also regularly plays test matches during the June and November test windows. Fiji also plays in the Pacific Tri-Nations, and has won the most Pacific Tri-Nations Championships of the three participating teams.

Fiji is one of the few countries where rugby union is the main sport. There are approximately 80,000 registered players from a total population of around 950,000. One obstacle for Fiji is simply getting their rugby players to play for the national team, as many have contracts in Europe or with Super Rugby teams where the money is far more rewarding. The repatriated salaries of its overseas stars have become an important part of some local economies.

The cibi (pronounced ) war dance is performed by the Fiji rugby team before each Test match. It has been used on the rugby field since 1939, though its origins date back to the country's warring times with its Pacific neighbours.

History

Early years
Rugby was first played in Fiji by European and Fijian soldiers of the Native Constabulary at Ba, on Viti Levu Island in 1884. In 1913 a Union was founded for the European settlers.

In December 1913, the All Blacks, who had been touring so very successfully in California, were on their way back to New Zealand. The Fiji RFU arranged a game with them at Albert Park, the first representative match to be played in the colony. The Fiji team were Europeans. The All Blacks won 67–3; Fiji's points came from a try scored by their captain and coach, PJ Sheehan. By 1914 a 'native competition' was started and in 1915 a Fiji Native Union was begun and became affiliated to the Fiji RFU.

Inter-war period

Fiji played their first international against Western Samoa in Apia, Samoa on 18 August 1924. Fiji's 20-man squad came exclusively from the five registered native clubs of the time. The match was played at 7 am to allow the Samoans time to get to work afterwards and was played on a pitch with a large tree on the halfway line. Fiji wore black and won 6–0 despite playing barefoot. The return match was won 9–3 by Samoa to draw the series. The first-ever Fiji test team continued their overseas adventure with a nine-match tour of Tonga. Though Fiji lost the first test played in Nukualofa 9–6, they were not to lose again, taking the second test 14–3 then drawing the decider 0–0. They won all six of the matches against non-test opposition.

Auckland University College were the first overseas side to visit Fiji in 1926, The Kiwi students played the Fiji Europeans and finished the three-match series with a win, loss and draw. Tonga also visited Fiji that year and for the first time Fiji played in their present strip of white jersey, palm tree badge and black shorts. The three match series finished level with Tonga winning the first test 9–6; Fiji winning the second 14–3 and the final game a 0–0 draw.

During the 1927 season, a General Meeting was called for the purpose of arranging a return visit to New Zealand at the invitation of Auckland University. Some 30 players expressed their willingness to make the trip, but after all arrangements had been made, there were insufficient players available so management cancelled the trip, much to the regret of Auckland.

Between 1924 and 1938 Fiji and Tonga played three test series every alternate year. During this period this was the only representative rugby union that Fiji played. Matches between the two Pacific nations were hard fought; many have claimed that the ancient feuding wars between the Islanders were transplanted onto the rugby field. Troubles during the third Test of Fiji's 1928 tour to Tonga forced the game to be abandoned with Tonga losing 11–8.
 
The first New Zealand Māori team to visit Fiji came in 1938. Fijians played in boots for the first time but there was still a tendency to take off boots during the match and throw them to the touch-line. On the five-match tour, the Māori beat Fiji 2nd XV and Fiji Europeans before playing a three match series. The first test ended in a 3–3 draw, the second an 11–5 win for the Fijians and the Māori won the final test 6–3 to square the series.

In 1939 Fiji toured New Zealand for the first time. Fiji's captain for that tour, Ratu Sir George Cakobau, decided that his side should have a war dance to rival the haka. He approached Ratu Bola, the high chief of the warrior clan of Navusaradave in Bau, who taught them the cibi which has been Fiji's pre-match ritual ever since. With many players still preferring to play barefoot, the Fijians played with a care-free spirit and created history by becoming the first team to go through a full tour of New Zealand unbeaten, winning seven and drawing one, a record that stands to this day. They played and beat the Māori again 14–4.

Post-war era

Fiji successfully toured New Zealand again in 1951. They beat the New Zealand Māori 21–14. Fiji's first tour of Australia helped the Australian Rugby Union recover from the brink of bankruptcy in 1952. The Test series was drawn 1–1 in front of record crowds. Australia won the first test 15–9 but the Fijians took the second with a 17–15 win.

A second tour of Australia took place in 1954 and again drew record crowds. Again Australia won the first test but only by 22–19.  The test series was drawn 1–1 after Fiji won the second test 18–16. The same year Fiji played host to Western Samoa. Fiji toured New Zealand again in 1957 and beat the Māoris 36–13 in Dunedin and 17–8 in Wellington, then defeated a strong Auckland team 38–17.

In 1964 Fiji toured Europe for the first time, they played five memorable games in Wales, culminating in a classic encounter in Cardiff that was talked about for years. Wales won 28–22 but conceded six tries for just the second time in their history. In 1970 a rampant Fijian side destroyed the Barbarians 29–9 at Gosforth. A last-minute try saw New Zealand safely through 14–13 over Fiji in Suva in 1974.

In August 1977 the British Lions made a stopover in Fiji on the way home from their tour of New Zealand. Fiji beat them 25–21 at Buckhurst Park, Suva. In 1982 Fiji beat Vancouver XV to begin a 15-match winning streak through to 1984.

Modern era

Fiji played their first full test against Wales in Cardiff in 1985, the home pack dominating in a 40–3 win with two tries to Phil Davies. Fiji were also heavily beaten by Llanelli and Cardiff, but lost by just one point in their test with Ireland.

Wales visited Suva the following year, where captain Dai Pickering's summer tour was to a premature end when he suffered concussion. Richard Moriarty took over and saw his side's 13–0 lead cut to a single point before Wales pulled away for a 15–22 win.

In 1987 Fiji made the quarter-final of the Rugby World Cup and seemed close to beating France according to the match referee, at one point even leading 4-3, but were eventually ground down by the French 31-16. 

In 1991 Rugby World Cup Fiji lost all three of its matches and finished bottom of its pool.  Wales' third test win over Fiji came in Suva in 1994. The tourists fielded a weakened line-up to allow all their squad a game, but they were good enough to run out 23–8 victors.

Fiji had a troubled tour of Wales and Ireland in 1995, losing six of nine games with defeat to Neath, Cardiff and Pontypridd. However, they managed to run Wales close at the Arms Park, losing only 15–19 win. They failed to qualify for the 1995 World Cup having lost to Tonga and Western Samoa.

Fiji rebuilt ahead of the 1999 World Cup, new coach Brad Johnstone instilling discipline and determination into their set-piece play. They made a winning start by beating Canada and Namibia and again seemed about to beat France in Toulouse when things went wrong. A controversial refereeing performance from Paddy O'Brien was felt to have cost them a win over France, Fiji losing 28–19. They did make the quarter-final play-off but lost 45–24 to the combative games; England at Twickenham. Soon after the tournament Johnstone departed for Italy.

In 2001 Fiji were crowned Pacific Rim champions, defeating Samoa 28–17 in the final in Tokyo. Fiji's played Wales again at the Millennium Stadium in November 2002. Two tries and 21 points from the boot of Stephen Jones helped the home side to a comfortable 58–14 win.

Fiji began their 2003 Rugby World Cup qualifying campaign in June 2002 when the three leading Pacific Island nations faced each other in a round robin in the second round of the Oceania zone qualifiers. The Fijians started with defeats of Samoa and Tonga, but their loss to Samoa on home soil meant that they had to beat Tonga by more than 20 points to finish top of the pool. This they duly did with a 47–20 win in Nadi. At the World Cup they beat Japan 41–13 and narrowly survived a scare against the US Eagles winning 19–18. However a 20–22 loss against Scotland and an 18–61 beating by France saw them finish third in their pool and fail to qualify for the knock-out stage.

Results since have been mixed for Fiji. Although they have traditionally been the strongest of the Pacific Nations, they were beaten 29–27 by New Zealand Maori in 2004 and went down 91–0 by the All Blacks. In July 2005, five Fiji internationals were banned from playing international rugby for the rest of the year following a drunken brawl in Japan after a Pacific Five Nations match.

Their 2007 season started off as one of Fiji's worst seasons. They had a very inexperienced team and lost to both pacific rivals Tonga and Samoa, and suffered heavy defeats to Australia and the Junior All Blacks. The only win for Fiji at the 2007 "Pacific 6 Nations" was against Japan, however they did manage an unexpected 14–14 draw against Australia A. With most of Fiji's more experienced players back in the team Fiji slowly improved in the 2007 world cup to qualify for the quarter finals for the first time in 20 years.

2007 Rugby World Cup

Fiji were placed in Pool B of the 2007 Rugby World Cup along with Wales, Canada, Japan and Australia.  After beating Japan and Canada in close matches, Fiji rested several key players against Australia for the crucial game against Wales. Australia defeated Fiji by 55–12. Fiji's fate in the tournament came down to a "winner advances" game against Wales which Fiji won 38–34 and qualified for the quarter-finals for the second time.  Former Wallaby great Michael Lynagh described the see-sawing match as one of the best matches "of all time". Fiji lost their quarter final match against South Africa, however their above expectations performance in the tournament resulted in them moving up to 9th in the world rankings – their highest ever position. Shannon Fraser and Gregg Mumm from Australia acted as assistant coaches for the period leading up to the world cup and were accredited for much of the Fijians side's success.

2011 Rugby World Cup

Fiji was placed in Pool D of the 2011 Rugby World Cup along with South Africa, Wales, Samoa and Namibia. Fiji won their first match against Namibia with 49–25. But it could not manage to repeat 2007 World Cup performance. They lost to South Africa, Wales and Samoa with huge margins. Final scores were 3–49 against South Africa, 7–27 against Samoa & 0–66 against Wales.[8]

Wins against Tier 1 nations

In addition, Fiji drew with Australia 3-3 on 1 July 1961 at the Olympic Park Stadium, Melbourne, Australia, as well as 16-16 with Wales on 19 November 2010 at the Millennium Stadium, Cardiff, Wales.

Record

Below is table of the representative rugby matches played by a Fiji national XV at test level up until 28 October 2022.

World Cup record

Kit history
Fiji traditionally plays with a home kit consisting of a white shirt, black shorts and black and white hooped socks. The away kit traditionally used to be a white and black hooped shirt with white shorts and hooped socks, although since KooGa's tenure as supplier, colours such as light blue or black were used. Since 2010, some jerseys started to have patterns similar to those found on the masi cloths on the jersey designs.

Kit Suppliers:
1970s–2003 Canterbury
2004–2005 Cotton Traders
2005–2016 KooGa–BLK
2017–2021 ISC
2021 – present Nike

Sponsors:
1994–1998: National Bank of Fiji
1998–2003: Vodafone
2004–2005: Digicel
2005–2007: Fiji Flour Mills
2009–2014: Fiji Airways
2014: Vodafone
2018: Fiji Airways
2021: Vodafone/Swire Shipping

Players

Current squad
On 17 October, head coach Vern Cotter named a 31-man squad for their 2022 End-of-Year tour, playing against Scotland, Ireland and the French Barbarians.

Head Coach:  Simon Raiwalui
 Caps Updated: 5 November 2022

Player records

Most caps

Last updated: Ireland vs Fiji, 12 November 2022. Statistics include officially capped matches only.

Most tries

Last updated: Ireland vs Fiji, 12 November 2022. Statistics include officially capped matches only.

Most points

Last updated: Ireland vs Fiji, 12 November 2022. Statistics include officially capped matches only.

Most points in a match

Last updated: Ireland vs Fiji, 12 November 2022. Statistics include officially capped matches only.

Most tries in a match

Last updated: Ireland vs Fiji, 12 November 2022. Statistics include officially capped matches only.

Most matches as captain

Last updated: Ireland vs Fiji, 12 November 2022. Statistics include officially capped matches only.

Notable players

 Sireli Bobo
 Alex Rokobaro
 Rupeni Caucaunibuca
 Bill Cavubati
 Vilimoni Delasau
 Alivereti Doviverata
 Sisa Koyamaibole
 Sunia Koto
 Maleli Kunavore
 Kele Leawere
 Josefa Levula
 Norman Ligairi
 Nicky Little
 Isa Nacewa
 Noa Nadruku
 Apenisa Naevo
 Semisi Naevo
 Sireli Naqelevuki
 Timoci Nagusa
 Napolioni Nalaga
 Seru Rabeni
 Simon Raiwalui
 Kameli Ratuvou
 Jacob Rauluni
 Mosese Rauluni
 Iferemi Rawaqa
 Apolosi Satala
 Viliame Satala
 Waisale Serevi
 Ilivasi Tabua
 Netani Talei
 Setareki Tawake
 Aisea Tuilevu
 Joeli Veitayaki
 Joeli Vidiri
 Marika Vunibaka
 Akapusi Qera

Nat Uluiviti, who also played for the Fiji national cricket team.

Coaches

See also

 Pacific Tri-Nations
 Fiji Rugby Union
 Rugby World Cup
 Fiji national rugby sevens team
 Fiji national rugby league team
 Pacific Islanders rugby union team
 Colonial Cup
 Digicel Cup

References

Sources
 Fire and flair: Fijian rugby (from the BBC)
 Fiji Rugby World Cup Points Table

External links
 Fiji rugby official site
 Rugby World Cup 2015 Schedule
 World Cup Preview
 Fijian rugby union news from Planet Rugby 
 Supporters website for the Pacific Islanders